El Hadji Badiane Sidibé (born 7 March 1994) is a Senegalese professional footballer who plays as a forward for Championnat National 3 club Côte Bleue.

Career statistics

References

External links
MLSZ 
HLSZ 

1994 births
Living people
Footballers from Dakar
Senegalese footballers
Association football forwards
Újpest FC players
US Créteil-Lusitanos players
Entente SSG players
Nemzeti Bajnokság I players
Championnat National 3 players
Championnat National players
Championnat National 2 players
Senegalese expatriate footballers
Expatriate footballers in Hungary
Expatriate footballers in France
Senegalese expatriate sportspeople in Hungary
Senegalese expatriate sportspeople in France